The Agrarian Party was a political party in Chile, formed in 1931 and dissolved in 1945 to form the Agrarian Labor Party.

Defunct political parties in Chile
Defunct agrarian political parties
Political parties established in 1931
Political parties disestablished in 1945
1931 establishments in Chile
1945 disestablishments in Chile